The 1991 Australian motorcycle Grand Prix was the second round of the 1991 Grand Prix motorcycle racing season. The race took place on the weekend of 5–7 April 1991 at Eastern Creek Raceway in Sydney, New South Wales. It was the first of six times the Australian motorcycle Grand Prix would be held at Eastern Creek before moving permanently back to Phillip Island in 1997.

500 cc classification

250 cc classification

125 cc classification

References

Australian motorcycle Grand Prix
Australian
Motorcycle
Motorsport at Eastern Creek Raceway
April 1991 sports events in Australia